Based on a True Story is an album released in 1988 by Del Lords on Enigma Records.

Track listing
All songs written by Scott Kempner.

Personnel 
The Del-Lords
Scott Kempner – lead vocals, guitar
Eric Ambel – guitar, vocals, keyboards on "The Cool and the Crazy" and "River of Justice", lead vocals on "Judas Kiss" and "A Lover's Prayer"
Manny Caiati – bass guitar, vocals
Frank Funaro – drums, vocals
Additional musicians and production
Scotty Bem – gong
Pat Benatar – backing vocals on "Judas Kiss" & "Poem of the River"
Lenny Castro – percussion
Spyder Curtis James – keyboards on "Judas Kiss", "Poem of the River" and "Ashes to Ashes"
Frank Linx – vocals on "Cheyenne", "Whole Lotta Nothin' Goin' On", "A Lover's Prayer", "Judas Kiss" and "River of Justice"
Rev. Mojo Nixon – sermon on "River of Justice"
Johnny Powers – harp on "River of Justice" and "A Lover's Prayer"
Kevin Savigar – keyboards on "Whole Lotta Nothin' Goin' On" and "Poem of the River"
Kim Shattuck & Karen Blankfeld of The Pandoras – vocals on "The Cool and the Crazy"
Syd Straw – backing vocals on "Judas Kiss", "River of Justice" and "Ashes to Ashes"
Gordon Fordyce – engineer
Michael Frondelli – mixing
Neil Geraldo – production
 Assistant engineers: Bill Cooper, Angus Davidson, Scott E. Gordon

References

External links 
 

1988 albums
The Del-Lords albums
Enigma Records albums